Howie Colborne (born June 28, 1950) is a Canadian former professional ice hockey player.

During the 1973–74 season, Colborne played two games in the World Hockey Association with the Edmonton Oilers. His professional career was predominantly with low-level minor teams in the Southern Hockey League and North American Hockey League, playing a combined 206 games, on four teams, over three seasons.

References

External links

1950 births
Living people
Boston Braves (AHL) players
Canadian ice hockey left wingers
Edmonton Oilers (WHA) players
Ice hockey people from Alberta
Long Island Cougars players
People from Northern Sunrise County
Philadelphia Firebirds (NAHL) players
Red Deer Rustlers players
Roanoke Valley Rebels (SHL) players
Winston-Salem Polar Twins (SHL) players